The 2010–11 Elitserien season was the 36th season of Elitserien. The regular season ran from 15 September 2010 to 5 March 2011, and the following playoffs ended on 14 April. HV71 won the regular season, scoring the game-winning empty net goal against Södertälje SK in the final round. Färjestads BK won the playoffs and thus became Swedish champions, beating Skellefteå AIK 4–1 in the finals. All of the local derby games between AIK and Djurgårdens IF were played in the Ericsson Globe.

On 26 December 2010, a game was held outdoors between Färjestads BK and Frölunda HC in Karlstad, continuing a tradition of outdoor games started in the previous season. Like last season, the home team won the game, this time in front of 15,274 spectators.

In Kvalserien, Modo Hockey requalified and Växjö Lakers HC qualified for the 2011–12 Elitserien season for the first time ever at the expense of Södertälje SK.

Regular season 
Magnus Johansson of the Linköpings HC scored the first goal of the season.

Standings

Games

Statistics

Scoring leaders 
 
GP = Games played; G = Goals; A = Assists; Pts = Points; +/– = Plus/minus; PIM = Penalty minutes

Leading goaltenders 
These are the leaders in GAA among goaltenders that have played at least 1200 minutes.

GP = Games played; TOI = Time on ice (minutes); GA = Goals against; SO = Shutouts; Sv% = Save percentage; GAA = Goals against average

Attendance

Playoffs 
The standard of eight teams qualify for the playoffs. HV71 won the regular season title for the second consecutive season with 96 points.

HV71 – Regular season champions, 96 points (+30 goal difference, 173 goals for)
Färjestads BK – 96 points (+30 goal difference, 154 goals for)
Skellefteå AIK – 96 points (+28 goal difference)
Luleå HF – 88 points
Linköpings HC – 85 points
Djurgårdens IF – 84 points
Brynäs IF – 81 points
AIK – 76 points

Playoff bracket 
In the first round, the highest remaining seed chose which of the four lowest remaining seeds to be matched against. In the second round, the highest remaining seed is matched against the lowest remaining seed. In each round the higher-seeded team is awarded home ice advantage. Each best-of-seven series follows an alternating home team format: the higher-seeded team will play at home for games 1 and 3 (plus 5 and 7 if necessary), and the lower-seeded team will be at home for game 2, 4 and 6 (if necessary).

Quarterfinals

(1) HV71 vs. (8) AIK

(2) Färjestads BK vs. (7) Brynäs IF

(3) Skellefteå AIK vs. (5) Linköpings HC

(4) Luleå HF vs. (6) Djurgårdens IF

Note: Game 6 was played in the Ericsson Globe.

Semifinals

(2) Färjestads BK vs. (8) AIK

Note: Game 4 was played in the Ericsson Globe.

(3) Skellefteå AIK vs. (4) Luleå HF

Finals

(2) Färjestads BK vs. (3) Skellefteå AIK

Playoff statistics

Playoff scoring leaders

Playoff leading goaltenders

Elitserien awards

Rule changes 
New rule changes include:
 For this season, a team receiving a penalty shot had to use the player fouled to perform the shot. Previously, the team could choose any player to take the shot.
 A player on the ice must be within 1.5 metres of the bench before his replacement could step on the ice.
 A player losing his helmet during play must leave the ice immediately.
 When a team with a player already in the penalty box has a delayed penalty and the opposing team scores, the player already in the box will exit and the player with the delayed penalty will serve his penalty.  Previously, the goal would negate the delayed penalty.
 A goal scored with the shaft of the stick would stand, even were the stick blade above the crossbar.
 The number of non-players allowed in the bench area was increased from six to eight.
 For the first time since the 2004–2005 season, the 2010–2011 season re-introduced shootout in regulation games.  Games tied after the first 60 minutes went to a 5-minute overtime period, and to a shootout if no goals were scored in the overtime.  If the teams scored equally with three penalty shots, a sudden-death shootout would result: if the first team scored, the second team would lose unless it could score in its next shot.  The player who gave his team the winning lead in the shootout was awarded a goal point in the protocol.  The first game to go into a shootout was in round 3, a Timrå IK victory over Luleå HF.

References

External links

 
Swe
Swedish Hockey League seasons
1